Au creux de ma terre is an album by French singer Gérard Jaffrès. It was released in 1999 under the Kelou Mad production  and Coop Breizh label.
All songs were written by Gérard Jaffrès.

This album depicts the culture and traditions of Brittany, blending Celtic music and Rock music (celtic rock).

The most popular songs are Au café du port, Gwenneg ebet, En piste, en virée  and Kenavo.

Track listing
 Gwenneg ebet
 Lettre à mon amie
 Droit devant
 Les îles lointaines
 Dix filles à marier
 Je n'ai aimé que toi
 En piste, en virée
 Va où le vent t'oubliera
 Au creux de ma terre
 Au café du port
 Toutes les marées reviennent
 Kenavo

References 

1999 albums
Gérard Jaffrès albums